In South Jersey and Philadelphia folklore in the United States, the Jersey Devil (also known as the Leeds Devil) is a legendary creature said to inhabit the forest of Pine Barrens in South Jersey. The creature is often described as a flying biped with hooves, but there are many variations. The common description is that of a bipedal kangaroo-like or wyvern-like creature with a horse- or goat-like head, leathery bat-like wings, horns, small arms with clawed hands, legs with cloven hooves, and a forked tail. It has been reported to move quickly and is often described as emitting a high-pitched "blood-curdling scream".

Origin of the legend

The Lenape people who also inhabited the Pine Barrens believed the area was inhabited by a spirit called M'Sing, which sometimes took the form of a "deer-like creature with leathery wings."

Mother Leeds's 13th child
According to popular folklore, the Jersey Devil originated with a Pine Barrens resident named Jane Leeds, known as "Mother Leeds." The legend states that Mother Leeds had twelve children and, after finding she was pregnant for the thirteenth time, cursed the child in frustration, crying that the child would be the "devil." In 1735, Mother Leeds was in labor on a stormy night while her friends gathered around her. Born as a normal child, the thirteenth child changed to a creature with hooves, a goat's head, bat wings, and a forked tail. Growling and screaming, the child beat everyone with its tail before flying up the chimney and heading into the pines. In some versions of the tale, Mother Leeds was supposedly a witch and the child's father was the devil, himself. Some versions of the legend also state that there was a subsequent attempt by local clergymen to exorcise the creature from the Pine Barrens.

The Leeds family
Prior to the early 1900s, the Jersey Devil was referred to as the Leeds Devil or the Devil of Leeds, either in connection with the local Leeds family or the eponymous southern New Jersey town, Leeds Point.

"Mother Leeds" has been identified by some as Deborah Leeds, on grounds that Deborah Leeds' husband, Japhet Leeds, named twelve children in the will he wrote during 1736, which is compatible with the legend. Deborah and Japhet Leeds also lived in the Leeds Point section of what is now Atlantic County, New Jersey, which is commonly the location of the Jersey Devil story.

Brian Regal, a historian of science at Kean University, theorizes that the story of Mother Leeds, rather than being based on a single historical person, originated from colonial southern New Jersey religio-political disputes that became the subject of folklore and gossip among the local population. According to Regal, folk legends concerning these historical disputes evolved through the years and ultimately resulted in the modern popular legend of the Jersey Devil during the early 20th century. Regal contends that "colonial-era political intrigue" involving early New Jersey politicians, Benjamin Franklin, and Franklin's rival almanac publisher Daniel Leeds (1651–1720) resulted in the Leeds family being described as "monsters", and it was Daniel Leeds' negative description as the "Leeds Devil", rather than any actual creature, that created the later legend of the Jersey Devil.

Much like the Mother Leeds of the Jersey Devil myth, Daniel Leeds' third wife had given birth to nine children, a large number of children even for the time. Leeds' second wife and first daughter had both died during childbirth. As a royal surveyor with strong allegiance to the British crown, Leeds had also surveyed and acquired land in the Egg Harbor area, located within the Pine Barrens. The land was inherited by Leeds' sons and family and is now known as Leeds Point, one of the areas in the Pine Barrens currently most associated with the Jersey Devil legend and alleged Jersey Devil sightings.

Starting in the 17th century, English Quakers established settlements in southern New Jersey, the region in which the Pine Barrens are located. Daniel Leeds, a Quaker and a prominent person of pre-Revolution colonial southern New Jersey, became ostracized by his Quaker congregation after his 1687 publication of almanacs containing astrological symbols and writings. Leeds' fellow Quakers deemed the astrology in these almanacs as too "pagan" or blasphemous, and the almanacs were censored and destroyed by the local Quaker community.

In response to and in spite of this censorship, Leeds continued to publish even more esoteric astrological Christian writings and became increasingly fascinated with Christian occultism, Christian mysticism, cosmology, demonology and angelology, and natural magic. In the 1690s, after his almanacs and writings were further censored as blasphemous or heretical by the Philadelphia Quaker Meeting, Leeds continued to dispute with the Quaker community, converting to Anglicanism and publishing anti-Quaker tracts criticizing Quaker theology and accusing Quakers of being anti-monarchists. In the ensuing dispute between Leeds and the southern New Jersey Quakers over Leeds' accusations, Leeds was endorsed by the much-maligned British royal governor of New Jersey, Lord Cornbury, despised among the Quaker communities. Leeds also worked as a councilor to Lord Cornbury about this time. Considering Leeds as a traitor for aiding the Crown and rejecting Quaker beliefs, the Quaker Burlington Meeting of southern New Jersey subsequently dismissed Leeds as "evil".

During 1716, Daniel Leeds' son, Titan Leeds, inherited his father's almanac business, which continued to use astrological content and eventually competed with Benjamin Franklin's popular Poor Richard's Almanack. The competition between the two men intensified when, during 1733, Franklin satirically used astrology in his almanac to predict Titan Leeds' death on October of that same year. Though Franklin's prediction was intended as a joke at his competitor's expense and a means to boost almanac sales, Titan Leeds was apparently offended at the death prediction, publishing a public admonition of Franklin as a "fool" and a "liar". In a published response, Franklin mocked Titan Leeds' outrage and humorously suggested that, in fact, Titan Leeds had died in accordance with the earlier prediction and was thus writing his almanacs as a ghost, resurrected from the grave to haunt and torment Franklin. Franklin continued to jokingly refer to Titan Leeds as a "ghost" even after Titan Leeds' actual death in 1738. Daniel Leeds' blasphemous and occultist reputation and his pro-monarchy stance in the largely anti-monarchist colonial south of New Jersey, combined with Benjamin Franklin's later continuous depiction of Titan Leeds as a ghost, may have originated or contributed to the local folk legend of a so-called "Leeds Devil" lurking in the Pine Barrens.

During 1728, Titan Leeds began to include the Leeds family crest on the masthead of his almanacs. The Leeds family crest depicted a wyvern, a bat-winged dragon-like legendary creature that stands upright on two clawed feet. Regal notes that the wyvern on the Leeds family crest is reminiscent of the popular descriptions of the Jersey Devil. The inclusion of this family crest on Leeds' almanacs may have further contributed to the Leeds family's poor reputation among locals and possibly influenced the popular descriptions of the Leeds Devil or Jersey Devil. The fearsome appearance of the crest's wyvern and the increasing animosity among local South Jersey residents towards royalty, aristocracy, and nobility (with whom family crests were associated) may have helped facilitate the legend of the Leeds Devil and the association of the Leeds family with "devils" and "monsters".

The Leeds Devil
Regal notes that, by the late 1700s and early 1800s at the latest, the "Leeds Devil" had become an ubiquitous legendary monster or ghost story in the southern New Jersey area. Into the early to mid-19th century, stories continued to circulate in southern New Jersey of the Leeds Devil, a "monster wandering the Pine Barrens". An oral tradition of "Leeds Devil" monster/ghost stories subsequently became established in the Pine Barrens area.

Although the "Leeds Devil" legend has apparently existed since the 18th century, Regal states that the more modern depiction of the Jersey Devil, as well as the now pervasive "Jersey Devil" name, first became truly standardized in current form during the early 20th century:

During the pre-Revolutionary period, the Leeds family, who called the Pine Barrens home, soured its relationship with the Quaker majority ... The Quakers saw no hurry to give their former fellow religionist an easy time in circles of gossip. His wives had all died, as had several children. His son Titan stood accused by Benjamin Franklin of being a ghost ... The family crest had winged dragons on it. In a time when thoughts of independence were being born, these issues made the Leeds family political and religious monsters. From all this over time the legend of the Leeds Devil was born. References to the 'Jersey Devil' do not appear in newspapers or other printed material until the twentieth century. The first major flap came in 1909. It is from these sightings that the popular image of the creature—batlike wings, horse head, claws, and general air of a dragon—became standardized.

Indeed, many references to a "Leeds Devil" or "Devil of Leeds" appear in earlier printed material prior to the widespread usage of the "Jersey Devil" name. During 1859, the Atlantic Monthly published an article detailing the Leeds Devil folk tales popular among Pine Barren residents (or "pine rats".) A newspaper from 1887 describes sightings of a winged creature, referred to as "the Devil of Leeds", allegedly spotted near the Pine Barrens and well known among the local populace of Burlington County, New Jersey:

Whenever he went near it, it would give a most unearthly yell that frightened the dogs. It whipped at every dog on the place. "That thing," said the colonel, "is not a bird nor an animal, but it is the Leeds devil, according to the description, and it was born over in Evesham, Burlington County, a hundred years ago. There is no mistake about it. I never saw the horrible critter myself, but I can remember well when it was roaming around in Evesham woods fifty years ago, and when it was hunted by men and dogs and shot at by the best marksmen there were in all South Jersey but could not be killed. There isn't a family in Burlington or any of the adjoining counties that does not know of the Leeds devil, and it was the bugaboo to frighten children with when I was a boy.

Reported sightings
There have been many claims of sightings and occurrences involving the Jersey Devil.

According to legend, while visiting the Hanover Mill Works to inspect his cannonballs being forged, Commodore Stephen Decatur sighted a flying creature and fired a cannonball directly upon it, to no effect.

Joseph Bonaparte, elder brother of Napoleon, is also claimed to have seen the Jersey Devil while hunting on his Bordentown estate about 1820.

During 1840, the Jersey Devil was blamed for several livestock killings. Similar attacks were reported during 1841, accompanied by tracks and screams.

In Greenwich during December 1925, a local farmer shot an unidentified animal as it attempted to steal his chickens, and then photographed the corpse. Afterward, he claimed that none of 100 people he showed it to could identify it. On July 27, 1937, an unknown animal "with red eyes" seen by residents of Downingtown, Pennsylvania was compared to the Jersey Devil by a reporter for the Pennsylvania Bulletin of July 28, 1937. In 1951, a group of Gibbstown, New Jersey boys claimed to have seen a 'monster' matching the Devil's description and claims of a corpse matching the Jersey Devil's description arose in 1957. During 1960, tracks and noises heard near Mays Landing were claimed to be from the Jersey Devil. During the same year the merchants around Camden offered a $10,000 reward for the capture of the Jersey Devil, even offering to build a private zoo to house the creature if it was captured.

Wave of sightings in 1909
During the week of January 16–23, 1909, newspapers published hundreds of claimed encounters with the Jersey Devil from all over South Jersey and the Philadelphia area. Among these alleged encounters were claims the creature "attacked" a trolley car in Haddon Heights and a social club in Camden. Police in Camden and Bristol, Pennsylvania supposedly fired on the creature to no effect. Other reports initially concerned unidentified footprints in the snow, but soon sightings of creatures resembling the Jersey Devil were being reported throughout South Jersey and as far away as Delaware and western Maryland. The widespread newspaper coverage created fear throughout the Delaware Valley prompting a number of schools to close and workers to stay home. Vigilante groups and groups of hunters roamed the pines and countrysides in search of the devil. During this period, it is rumored that the Philadelphia Zoo posted a $10,000 reward for the creature. The offer prompted a variety of hoaxes, including a kangaroo equipped with artificial claws and bat wings.

Description and explanation
Skeptics believe the Jersey Devil to partially be nothing more than a creative manifestation upon the imaginations of the early English settlers, with plausible natural explanations including: bogeyman stories created and told by bored Pine Barren residents as a form of children's entertainment; the byproduct of the historical local disdain for the Leeds family; the misidentification of known animals; and rumors based on common negative perceptions of the local rural population of the Pine Barren (known as "pineys").

The frightening reputation of the Pine Barrens may indeed have contributed to the Jersey Devil legend. Historically, the Pine Barrens was considered inhospitable land. Gangs of highwaymen, such as the politically disdained Loyalist brigands, known as the Pine Robbers, were known to rob and attack travelers passing through the Barrens. During the 1700s and 1800s, residents of the isolated Pine Barrens were deemed the dregs or outcasts of society: poor farmers, fugitives, brigands, Native Americans, poachers, moonshiners, runaway slaves, and deserting soldiers. So-called pineys have sometimes fostered certain frightening stories about themselves and the Pine Barrens to discourage outsiders or intruders from entering the Barrens. Pineys were further demonized and vilified after two eugenics studies were published during the early 20th century, which depicted pineys as congenital idiots and criminals, as seen in the research performed on "The Kallikak Family" by Henry H. Goddard, which is now considered biased or inaccurate and, most likely, falsified.

Jeff Brunner of the Humane Society of New Jersey thinks the sandhill crane is the basis of the Jersey Devil stories, adding, "There are no photographs, no bones, no hard evidence whatsoever, and worst of all, no explanation of its origins that doesn't require belief in the supernatural."

Outdoorsman and author Tom Brown Jr. spent several seasons living in the wilderness of the Pine Barrens. He recounts occasions when terrified hikers mistook him for the Jersey Devil, after he covered his whole body with mud to repel mosquitoes.

Medical sociologist Robert E. Bartholomew and author Peter Hassall cite the 1909 series of sightings (and the subsequent public panic) as a classic example of mass hysteria begun by a regional urban legend.

One New Jersey group called the "Devil Hunters" refer to themselves as "official researchers of the Jersey Devil", and devote time to collecting reports, visiting historic sites, and going on nocturnal hunts in the Pine Barrens in order to "find proof that the Jersey Devil does in fact exist."

Due in part to their isolated and undeveloped nature, the Pine Barrens have themselves fostered various folk legends. Apart from the Jersey Devil, many other legends are associated with the Pine Barrens; supernatural creatures and ghosts said to haunt the pine forests include the ghost of the pirate Captain Kidd, who supposedly buried treasure in the Pine Barrens and is sometimes allegedly seen in the company of the Jersey Devil; the ghost of the Black Doctor, the benevolent spirit of an African-American doctor who, after being forbidden from practicing medicine due to his race, entered the Pine Barrens to practice medicine in the isolated communities of the Barrens and is said to still come to the aid of lost or injured travelers; the ghost of the Black Dog, which, unlike many black dog legends, is usually portrayed as harmless; the ghost of the Golden-Haired Girl, the spirit of a girl who is said to be staring out into the sea, dressed in white, mourning the loss of her lover at sea; and the White Stag, a ghostly white deer said to rescue travelers in the Barrens from danger. There are also folk tales concerning the Blue Hole, an unusually clear blue and rounded body of water located in the Pine Barrens between Monroe Township, Gloucester County and Winslow Township, Camden County and often associated with the Jersey Devil.

Writing in Jan Harold Brunvand's American Folklore: An Encyclopedia, Rutgers Professor Angus Kress Gillespie called the Jersey Devil "an obscure regional legend" for most of its existence, and said that "after more than 250 years in oral circulation, the legend of the 'Jersey Devil' has many variations ...". Gillespie cites the Devil's image used on T-shirts, buttons, and postcards, and cocktails named after the Devil, as indications that "the recent history of the Jersey Devil is more in the realm of popular culture than folklore".

Hoaxes
Gordon Stein in Encyclopedia of Hoaxes (1993) noted that the alleged footprints of the Jersey Devil during 1909 resembled a horse's hoof. According to Stein, a man later admitted he had faked some of these footprints.

Geoff Tibballs in The World's Greatest Hoaxes (2006) has claimed that Norman Jeffries was involved in hoaxing the Jersey Devil:

He also planted nonfictional newspaper stories about new sightings of the Devil. During 1909, Jeffries with his friend Jacob Hope, an animal trainer, purchased a kangaroo from a circus and glued artificial claws and bat wings onto it. They declared to the public they had captured the Devil and it was displayed at the museum. Twenty years later, Jeffries admitted to the hoax.

Cultural relevance

In Man and Beast in American Comic Legend, folklorist Richard Dorson outlines a six-point criteria for establishing distinction among legendary creatures of American folklore. While the Jersey Devil was not expressly cited by Dorson, it nevertheless qualifies for this same level of relevance. Dorson specifies that the qualifier must: exist in oral tradition, inspire belief and conviction, become personalized and institutionalized, be fanciful or mythical , and contain a "comical side," which endears it to the American public.

Oral tradition of the Jersey Devil well predates printed newspaper accounts, and belief in its existence by many continues. The latter is made evident not only by commentators who elaborate on this possibility but also by investigative programs such as Mother Leeds' 13th Child, In Search of Monsters, Lore and Monsters and Mysteries in America.

Likewise, as a fixture of organizations, it is the namesake for two professional ice hockey teams. The first, the Jersey Devils of the Eastern Hockey League, played from 1964 until the league folded in 1973. The second, the New Jersey Devils of the National Hockey League, have played since 1982. The current team was formerly known as the Colorado Rockies, and their name was chosen by a poll shortly after the team relocated to New Jersey. This same trend towards cultural incorporation is further exemplified by the Jersey Devil's appropriation in toy lines, such as its inclusion as a vinyl figure in Cryptozoic Entertainment Cryptkins blind box, as well as its application as a motif by Six Flags Great Adventure for their Jersey Devil Coaster developed by Rocky Mountain Construction.

Moreover, the Jersey Devil's fanciful or mythical nature is explored in the numerous works of fantasy it makes an appearance in, including: The X-Files, Jersey Devil (video game), The Wolf Among Us, 13th Child, TMNT, The Real Adventures of Jonny Quest, The Barrens, Carny, Poptropica, A Night With The Jersey Devil, The Last Broadcast, Legend Quest, What We Do in the Shadows, Gravity Falls and Supernatural; many of which, such as TMNT and Jersey Devil (video game), not only reflect the Jersey Devil's mythical character but exemplify its comical nature as well.

See also

 Belled buzzard
 Dover Demon
 Fearsome critters
 Goatman (urban legend)
 Mothman
 Sasquatch
 Snallygaster

References

Relevant literature
 Regal, Brian and Frank J. Esposito (2018). The Secret History of the Jersey Devil: How Quakers, Hucksters, and Benjamin Franklin Created a Monster. Baltimore: Johns Hopkins University Press.

External links

 Pinelands Preservation Alliance – Jersey Devil Hunt & Pinelands Folklore
 What is the Jersey Devil New Jersey Digital Highway
 

American legendary creatures
Cryptids
Devils
Fearsome critters
Monsters
Mythological hybrids
New Jersey culture
New Jersey folklore
Paranormal hoaxes
Pine Barrens (New Jersey)
Supernatural legends
North American demons